For a musical composition commonly known as Unfinished Symphony, see Symphony No. 8 (Schubert)
For a film based on this composition, see Unfinished Symphony (film)
For a 2005 medical documentary, see The Unfinished Symphony
For an article about various musical compositions, see Unfinished symphony